Say Us is the first full-length studio album by the Canadian indie band Zeus. The vinyl LP was released 9 February 2010, with the CD version released 23 February 2010.  A digital download was made available, with the LP version.  All three versions were released in Canada by Arts & Crafts Records.

Critical reception
In a positive review of the album, critic Noel Murray of the AV Club said fans of Sloan and of the New Pornographers should "warm immediately to Zeus", and wrote that "after moonlighting from their gig as Jason Collett’s backing band... [they] deserve to move from the side of the stage to the front."

Critic Andrew Leahey wrote that Say Us "re-creates the sunny strains of Sloan, The Hollies, and the Beatles to charming effect."

In a neutral review, critic Pieter J Macmillan wrote that the band's democratic approach to singing and song writing lead to a remarkable coherence of sound throughout the album.  However, he continued the album's "lack of originality is felt particularly strong... in the lyrics."

Track listing

Personnel
 Rob Drake – drums tracks 3, 7, 9, 10, 11
 Carlin Nicholson – drums tracks 1, 2, 4; Bass tracks 1, 6, 9, 10, 11; Vocal harmony tracks 1, 3, 4, 5, 6, 9, 10, 11; acoustic guitar track 2; piano tracks 2, 12; electric piano track 3
 Mike O'Brien – drums track 12; Bass tracks 3, 7, 12; Vocal harmony tracks 2, 3, 5, 7, 8, 9, 11, 12; electric guitar tracks 1, 2, 5, 6, 7, 8, 9, 11, 12; piano tracks 1, 4, 10
 Neil Quin – drums track 5; Bass track 5; Vocal harmony track 6, 10; acoustic guitar tracks 3, 4, 10; electric guitar tracks 3, 4, 5, 10; piano tracks 9, 10

Guest performers
 Dave Azzolini – drums track 8; Vocal harmony tracks 2, 4, 8, 9; acoustic guitar track 12; electric guitar tracks 4, 6, 9
 Bryden Baird – trumpet tracks 4, 8
 Peter Elkas – slide guitar track 12
 Jessica Grassia – Vocal harmony tracks 1, 2, 4, 8, 9, 10, 12
 Afie Jurvanen – Vocal harmony track 4; electric guitar tracks 4, 8
 Taylor Knox – drums track 6; Vocal harmony track 2
 Liam Nicholson – Vocal harmony tracks 2, 4; Vocal harmony tracks 2, 4, 10
 Leon Patterson – Vocal harmony track 4; electric guitar track 4

Production
 Benny Cloutier Jr. – front cover illustration
 Mike O'Brien, Robyn Kotyk, Zeus – design and layout
 Mike O'Brien, Andrea Wilson – plasticine art
 Mike O'Brien, Carlin Nicholson – producer
 Robbie Lackritz – mixing

Footnotes

Citations

References

.

External links
 Zeus official site at Arts & Crafts
 Zeus on Myspace
 Zeus at CBC Radio 3

2010 albums
Zeus (band) albums
Arts & Crafts Productions albums